The Alabama Power Headquarters Building is an 18-story (98 m), corporate headquarters building located in Birmingham, Alabama. The building, completed in 1990, is part of the Alabama Power Headquarters Complex which is composed of four office buildings, two parking decks, and two parking lots. The Alabama Power Headquarters Complex is one of several corporate buildings Southern Company has in the Birmingham area, the others being in the Inverness and Lakeshore area. Alabama Power also operates several retail business offices throughout the state, more than 60 different storerooms across six geographical divisions, and a large complex in northern Calera, Alabama.

See also
Alabama Power Company
Birmingham, Alabama
Southern Company

External links
Emporis Website

Skyscraper office buildings in Birmingham, Alabama
Buildings and structures completed in 1990
Alabama Power
1990 establishments in Alabama